Donald David Drumm (October 24, 1887 – January 9, 1968) was an American college football and basketball player and coach.  Drumm served as the head football coach at Marietta College from 1912 to 1916 and again in 1942 and at West Virginia Wesleyan College in 1919.  Drumm died on January 9, 1968, at Memorial Hospital in Marietta, Ohio.

References

External links
 Sports-Reference profile

1887 births
1968 deaths
Marietta Pioneers athletic directors
Marietta Pioneers baseball players
Marietta Pioneers football coaches
Marietta Pioneers football players
Marietta Pioneers men's basketball coaches
Marietta Pioneers men's basketball players
West Virginia Wesleyan Bobcats and Lady Bobcats athletic directors
West Virginia Wesleyan Bobcats football coaches
Sportspeople from Marietta, Ohio
American men's basketball players
Basketball coaches from Ohio
Basketball players from Ohio